The Dyck Arboretum of the Plains is a thirteen-acre (53,000 m2) botanical garden at Hesston College in Hesston, Kansas, United States.  It was established October 11, 1981, to feature native Kansan plants and trees, and now contains more than 600 species of native and adaptable trees, shrubs, wildflowers, and grasses.

The Arboretum contains plant varieties from all the major grassland biomes of central North America, including wildflowers of the Great Plains, a buffalograss meadow, beds of tallgrass, shortgrass and mixed-grass prairie plants.

See also
 List of botanical gardens in the United States

External links
 
 , from Hatteberg's People on KAKE TV news

Arboreta in Kansas
Botanical gardens in Kansas
Protected areas of Harvey County, Kansas